National Highway 334A, commonly referred to as NH 334A is a national highway in  India. It is a spur road of National Highway 334. NH-334A traverses the states of Uttarakhand and Uttar Pradesh in India.

Route 
Purkazi, Laksar, Haridwar.

Junctions  

  Terminal near Purquazi.

See also 

 List of National Highways in India
 List of National Highways in India by state

References

External links 
 Rationalisation of Numbering Systems of National Highways, Department of Road Transport and Highways

National highways in India
National Highways in Uttarakhand
National Highways in Uttar Pradesh